King Solomon's Treasure is a 1979 British-Canadian low-budget film based on the novels King Solomon's Mines (1885) and Allan Quatermain (1887) by H. Rider Haggard. It stars John Colicos as Allan Quatermain, as well as David McCallum, Britt Ekland, and Patrick Macnee who replaced Terry-Thomas.

Cast
 David McCallum as Sir Henry Curtis
 John Colicos as Allan Quatermain
 Patrick Macnee as Captain John Good R.N.
 Britt Ekland as Queen Nyleptha
 Yvon Dufour as Alphonse
 Ken Gampu as Umslopogaas
 Wilfrid Hyde-White as Oldest Club Member
 John Quentin as Stetopatris
 Véronique Béliveau as Neva
 Sam Williams as High Priest
 Hugh Rouse as Reverend MacKenzie
 Fiona Fraser as Mrs. Mackenzie
 Camilla Hutton as Flossie 
 John Boylan as Club member
 Ian De Voy as Club member

Production
McCallum later said he did the film "because I got to go to Swaziland... the movie is something you'll have to see on a plane or on late night television."

Reception 
TV Guide had this to say about the film: "The cast of seasoned veterans (McCallum, Macnee, Ekland) contribute embarrassingly bad performances. Surprisingly, though, the photography—the film is shot on location in Africa as well as in London and Canadian studios—is not bad at all."

A 1979 article said the film "never saw the light of day".

References

External links

King Solomon's Treasure at BFI
 Zone Troopers: Website about the different Allan Quatermain and King Solomon's Mine films

Films based on King Solomon's Mines
Films set in Africa
Films shot in Eswatini
British adventure films
1970s adventure films
Canadian drama films
English-language Canadian films
Treasure hunt films
Films set in the 1880s
Films based on multiple works
1970s English-language films
Films directed by Alvin Rakoff
1970s Canadian films
1970s British films